The H-Town Texas Cyclones were a team of the Independent Women's Football League. Based in Houston, the Cyclones played their home games at Reggie Grob Stadium on the campus of the Spring Branch Independent School District. The Cyclones were the second IWFL team based in Houston, after the Houston Energy. However, while the Energy competes in Tier I, the Cyclones were expected to compete in Tier II. Both teams were to compete for talent and fans with the Women's Football Alliance's Houston Power.

In their inaugural season, when they played in the National Women's Football Association the Cyclones defeated the West Michigan Mayhem 39-10 to win the NWFA Championship, the league's last before folding. Their sophomore season (in which they were members of the WFA) was not as successful, as they were only credited two wins that season (both by default when the East Texas Saberkats folded). In their final season of the IWFL, they went winless are 0-8 without going to playoffs. Afterwards, the team folded.

Season-By-Season

|-
| colspan="6" align="center" | H-Town Texas Cyclones (NWFA)
|-
|2008 || 7 || 1 || 0 || 1st South Central || Won Southern Conference Quarterfinals (Oklahoma City)Won Southern Conference Semifinals (St. Louis)Won Southern Conference Championship (Los Angeles)Won NWFA Championship (West Michigan)
|-
| colspan="6" align="center" | H-Town Texas Cyclones (WFA)
|-
|2009 || 2 || 6 || 0 || 3rd American Southwest || --
|-
| colspan="6" align="center" | H-Town Texas Cyclones (IWFL)
|-
|2010 || 0 || 8 || 0 || 8th Tier II Midwest || --
|-
!Totals || 13 || 15 || 0
|colspan="2"| (including playoffs)

Season schedules

2009

** = Won by forfeit

2010

External links
 H-Town Texas Cyclones official website

Independent Women's Football League
American football teams in Houston
American football teams established in 2008
American football teams disestablished in 2009
2008 establishments in Texas
2009 disestablishments in Texas
Women's sports in Texas